Colin MacInnes (20 August 1914 – 22 April 1976) was an English novelist and journalist.

Early life
MacInnes was born in London, the son of singer James Campbell McInnes and novelist Angela Mackail, who was the granddaughter of the Pre-Raphaelite artist Edward Burne-Jones and also related to Rudyard Kipling and Stanley Baldwin. MacInnes's parents divorced and his mother remarried. The family relocated to Australia in 1920, MacInnes returning in 1931.  For much of his childhood, he was known as Colin Thirkell, the surname of his mother's second husband; later he used his father's name McInnes, afterwards changing it to MacInnes.

He worked in Brussels from 1930 until 1935, then studied painting in London at the London Polytechnic school and the School of Drawing and Painting in Euston Road.
Towards the end of his life, he stayed at the home of Martin Green, his publisher, and Green's wife Fiona, in Fitzrovia, where MacInnes spent time, regarding their small family as his own adoptive one until his death.

Career
MacInnes served in the British Intelligence Corps during the Second World War, and worked in occupied Germany after the European armistice. These experiences resulted in the writing of his first novel, To the Victors the Spoils.  Soon after his return to England, he worked for BBC Radio until he could earn a living from his writing.

He was the author of a number of books depicting London youth and black immigrant culture during the 1950s, in particular City of Spades (1957), Absolute Beginners (1959) and Mr Love & Justice (1960), known collectively as the "London trilogy". Many of his books were set in the Notting Hill area of London, then a poor and racially mixed area, home to many new immigrants and which suffered a race riot during 1958. Openly bisexual, he wrote on subjects including urban squalor, racial issues, bisexuality, drugs, anarchy, and "decadence".

Mr Love & Justice concerns two characters, Frank Love and Edward Justice, during late 1950s London. Mr Love is a novice ponce (pimp); Mr Justice is a police officer newly transferred to the plain-clothes division of the Vice Squad.  Gradually their lives intermesh.

Adaptations and influence
Absolute Beginners was filmed in 1986 by director Julien Temple. In 2007 a stage adaptation by Roy Williams was performed at the Lyric Theatre, Hammersmith, London.

David Bowie appeared in the film Absolute Beginners and recorded the title song, which was a hit in England.

City of Spades was adapted by Biyi Bandele as a radio play, directed by Toby Swift, broadcast on BBC Radio 4 on 28 April 2001.

MacInnes occurs as a character in Tainted Love (2005), Stewart Home's novel of 1960s and 1970s counterculture.

Billy Bragg's  albums England, Half English (2002) and Mr. Love & Justice (2008) borrowed their titles from books by MacInnes.

The Jam released a single called "Absolute Beginners" in 1981.

Bibliography
 To the Victor the Spoils (MacGibbon & Kee, 1950; Allison & Busby, 1986)
 June in Her Spring (MacGibbon & Kee, 1952; Faber & Faber, 2008)
 City of Spades (MacGibbon & Kee, 1957; Allison & Busby, 1980)
 Absolute Beginners (MacGibbon & Kee, 1959; Allison & Busby, 1980)
 Mr Love & Justice (MacGibbon & Kee, 1960; Allison & Busby, 1980)
 England, Half English (MacGibbon & Kee, 1961) – a collection of previously published journalism
 London, City of Any Dream (Thames & Hudson, 1962) – photo essay
 Australia and New Zealand (Time Life, 1964)
 All Day Saturday (MacGibbon & Kee, 1966)
 Sweet Saturday Night (MacGibbon & Kee, 1967) – a history of British musichall
 Westward to Laughter (MacGibbon & Kee, 1969)
 Three Years to Play (MacGibbon & Kee, 1970)
 Loving Them Both: A Study of Bisexuality (Martin Brian and O'Keeffe, 1973)
 Out of the Garden (HarperCollins, 1974)
 No Novel Reader (Martin Brian & O'Keeffe, 1975)
 Out of the Way: Later Essays (Martin Brian & O'Keeffe, 1980)
 Absolute MacInnes: The Best of Colin MacInnes (Allison & Busby, 1985)
 Fancy Free Unpublished novel (MS and typescript); gifted to Fiona Green, 1973
 Visions of London (MacGibbon & Kee 1969)

Further reading
 Gould, Tony. Inside Outsider: The Life and Times of Colin MacInnes. London: Allison and Busby, 1983.
 White, Jerry.  "Colin MacInnes: 'Absolute Beginners' - 1959".  London Fictions.  Retrieved 20 August 2019.

References

External links
"Colin MacInnes's 'City of Spades'", article on the London Fictions site
"The London of 'Absolute Beginners'" on the London Fictions site
"Kilburn and Stepney in 'Mr Love and Justice'" on London Fictions
Colin MacInnes at Allison & Busby.
Nick Bentley, "Writing 1950s London: Narrative Strategies in Colin MacInnes's City of Spades and Absolute Beginners", article in Literary London Journal.

Bisexual novelists
English people of Scottish descent
1914 births
1976 deaths
English LGBT novelists
20th-century English novelists
English male novelists
20th-century English male writers
20th-century English LGBT people